Apocalypshit is the second studio album by the Mexican band Molotov produced by Mario Caldato, Jr. The album was released in September 1999 on Surco Records. Apocalypshit was the first Molotov album to be released in the US.

Track listing

Appearances in popular culture
In 2001, the song "Polkas Palabras" was used as a soundtrack for the motion picture The Fast and the Furious, when Brian breaks into Hector's garage, while he is having a party.

In 2005 songs by Molotov were used in the Edidios video game "Total Overdose: A Gunslingers Tale in Mexico" released for PS2 and PSP.

In 2008, the song "Apocalypshit" was used in the pilot of Breaking Bad, "Pilot", during the final scene where Walt and Jesse escape from the cook site in the desert.

Sales and certifications

References

1999 albums
Molotov (band) albums
Albums produced by Gustavo Santaolalla